Jack Whitley (1880–1955) was an English footballer who played in the Football League for Aston Villa, Chelsea, Darwen, Everton, Lincoln City, Leeds City and Stoke.

Career
Whitley was born in Seacombe,  Cheshire, and played amateur football with Liscard YMCA before joining Football League side Darwen in 1899. He played 14 times for Darwen in the Second Division as they lost their Football League status and so he joined Aston Villa for £50. He managed eleven appearances for Villa before signing for Everton  where he played second fiddle to George Kitchen. He joined Stoke in 1904 and played in 34 matches during the 1904–05 season before losing his place to Leigh Richmond Roose. He then moved on to Leeds City and Lincoln City before finally finding regular football with Chelsea.

Legacy
Following his death in 1955, Whitley was buried in an unmarked grave at Brompton Cemetery, next to Chelsea's Stamford Bridge ground, the only Chelsea player known to be buried there. In 2017, the Chelsea Supporters Trust launched an appeal to fund the cost of a gravestone.

Career statistics
Source:

References

External links
 Jack Whitley Leeds City profile at mightyleeds.co.uk
 Jack Whitley Chelsea player profile at stamford-bridge.com

English footballers
Aston Villa F.C. players
Chelsea F.C. players
Darwen F.C. players
Everton F.C. players
Leeds City F.C. players
Lincoln City F.C. players
Stoke City F.C. players
English Football League players
1880 births
1955 deaths
People from Wallasey
Burials at Brompton Cemetery
Association football goalkeepers